"Lover Man (Oh, Where Can You Be?)" (often called simply "Lover Man") is a 1941 popular song written by Jimmy Davis, Roger ("Ram") Ramirez, and James Sherman. It is particularly associated with Billie Holiday, for whom it was written, and her version was inducted into the Grammy Hall of Fame in 1989.

Holiday's version reached No. 5 on the R&B chart and No. 16 on pop in 1945. In July 1946, Charlie Parker recorded a rendition of "Lover Man" while he was intoxicated. Dial Records producer Ross Russell had to hold him up to the microphone during the recording. Sonny Stitt played the song many times on alto saxophone in a virtuoso way, in the original key of D flat. Most jazz musicians play the song nevertheless in F. Barbra Streisand recorded a version for her album Simply Streisand in 1967, her version peaked #29 at Billboard Adult Contemporary chart.

Cover versions
Sarah Vaughan recorded the song for the Guild label in 1945 with backing by an instrumental ensemble that included trumpeter Dizzy Gillespie and saxophonist Charlie Parker. Parker recorded an instrumental version of the song himself in 1946 but he was intoxicated with alcohol during the session, and he was angry when he learned his producer, Ross Russell, released the song despite its flaws. Other saxophone jazzmen who have covered the song include Sonny Stitt, Phil Woods, Cannonball Adderley, Art Pepper, Charles McPherson, and an extended duet between Coleman Hawkins and Sonny Rollins. Jazz critic Ted Gioia named a version by alto player Lee Konitz backed by Stan Kenton as the best interpretation, balancing the song's emotional aspects with the intellectual quest of jazz.

Charts

References

External links
"Lover Man..." at jazzstandards.com

1941 songs
1940s jazz standards
Billie Holiday songs
Grammy Hall of Fame Award recipients
Jazz compositions in B-flat minor